The , shortly known as the , is the Eastern Gate Bridge of the Kangla Fort of Imphal, .
With the re-opening of the modern Eastern Gate of the Kangla, the Kangla Western Gate was closed forever, under the leadership of Nongthombam Biren, the then Chief Minister of Manipur, due to the traditional Meitei belief that the western gate is regarded as the gate of the dead and it is ominous to enter the Kangla through the western doorway.

History 
The antique Kangla Nongpok Thong was dismantled by the British Army after their victory in the Anglo-Manipur War of 1891 AD, as the Assam Rifles was stationed inside the western side of the Kangla.

Modern re-construction 
During June 2019, a decision to reconstruct the old Kangla Nongpok Thong was taken in a meeting session of the Kangla Fort Board (KFB) with the Manipur Chief Minister N Biren Singh in the chair inside the premises of the Kangla Fort.

The re-construction of the modern Kangla Nongpok Thong was done by the Manipur Police Housing Corporation Limited (MPHC Ltd). It was financed by the Imphal Smart City Limited (ISCL).

The timing of the reopening of the Nongpok Thong was expected to be around October of the year 2021, as planned by Chief minister Biren. But due to some reasons, it got delayed.

Re-opening 
On 6 January 2023, the Kangla Nongpok Thong was officially inaugurated by Amit Shah, the then Minister of Home Affairs of the Union Government of India.
On the occasion of inauguration, Nongthombam Biren, the then Chief Minister of Manipur, said:

On the same occasion, Narendra Modi, the then Prime minister of India, replied to Manipur Chief Minister's speech as:

Development 
According to the plans of Manipur Chief Minister Nongthombam Biren, the Nongpok Thong will be guarded by Indian Reserve Battalion (IRB) policemen, wearing traditional Meitei uniforms, instead of modern formal ones, the Nongchup Thong (Western Kangla Gate) will be closed afterwards, vehicles will only be allowed to enter from the Northern Gate of the Kangla, the roadway from the Eastern Gate towards the office of the District collector (DC) of Imphal East district, will be made as a double lane one.

Eviction 
The Government of Manipur performed eviction of the illegal encroachers from the areas near the historic Kangla Nongpok Thong after its opening program.
The departments concerned used heavy machinery to bring down many residential and commercial buildings built encroaching the place near the eastern-most area of the Kangla Nongpok Thong.

Interpretation of the event 
The incident of the reopening of the "Nongpok Thong" was mentioned in the old Meitei chronicles. In modern times, it is interpreted in many ways by many scholars. Another interpretation is that it refers to the opening of trade relations with Myanmar and other Southeast Asian nations.

See also 
 Hijagang
 Iputhou Pakhangba Laishang
 Kangla Sha
 Manung Kangjeibung
 Sanggai Yumpham

Notes

References

External links 
 Kangla Nongpok Thong at 
 Kangla Nongpok Thong at 

Meitei architecture
Cultural heritage of India
Landmarks in India
Meitei culture
Monuments and memorials in India
Monuments and memorials in Imphal
Monuments and memorials in Manipur
Monuments and memorials to Meitei people
Monuments and memorials to Meitei royalties
Public art in India
Tourist attractions in India